Lesley Walter is an Australian poet. She holds a Master of Letters degree in Australian Literature from the University of Sydney, and is a past president of the Society of Women Writers NSW Inc. She lives in Sydney.

Awards
 2004 Gwen Harwood Poetry Prize

Works
 "Hyphenated Lives", Island, No.101, Winter 2005 
 
 Life Drawings. Walleah Press 2014.

Anthologies

Non-fiction
 The Natural Way to Better Birth and Bonding (Random House, 2000)

References

Year of birth missing (living people)
Living people
Australian poets